Countess Darya Petrovna Saltykova (née Countess Chernyshyova; ; 20 September 1739 – December 23, 1802), was a Russian lady in waiting, socialite and noble and Dame of the Order of St. Catherine's first degree. She was the sister of the lady in waiting Princess Nataliya Petrovna Chernysheva, and in 1769 married to Field Marshal Count Ivan Petrovich Saltykov.

Life
The eldest daughter of a diplomat, Count Peter G. Chernyshev, godson of Peter the Great, and many believed to be for his son, and Catherine Andreevna, daughter of a famous chief of the secret office during the time of Biron, Count Andrei Ivanovich Ushakov. She spent her early life abroad with her father, and upon her return in 1762, she and her sister became known as two of the most learned women in Russia. In 1762, she was appointed maid of honor to Empress Catherine the Great. She participated in the famous court masquerade of 1766 and at the great amateur theatre performance of 1768, where she was given much attention. After her marriage in 1769, she became a leading figure in the Russian nobility. In 1780–83, she made a trip to Europe with her family, and on their return, her spouse was made governor of Vladimir. In 1793, she was appointed lady in waiting.

Saltykova died in Moscow.

See also 
 Filipp Vigel, diarist who wrote about her

References
 Белосельский М. А., Белосельская Н. Г., Белосельская Н. М. Дневник Белосельских — Строгановых // Российский Архив: История Отечества в свидетельствах и документах XVIII—XX вв.: Альманах. — М.: Студия ТРИТЭ: Рос. Архив, 2005. — [Т. XIV]. — С. 71—90.

1739 births
1802 deaths
Ladies-in-waiting from the Russian Empire
Nobility from the Russian Empire
Socialites from the Russian Empire